Bockenem (Eastphalian: Bokeln) is a town in the district of Hildesheim, Lower Saxony, Germany that was founded in 1154. It is located on the German Timber-Frame Road.

Surrounding villages

Jerze
Königsdahlum
Bornum
Mahlum
Schlewecke
Ortshausen
Volkersheim
Hary
Störy
Bönnien
Werder
Nette
Upstedt
Bültum
Groß Ilde
Klein Ilde
Wohlenhausen

Sights
The village of Störy was famous for having the largest museum of small cars in the world. The museum, however, was closed around 2005.
The nave of the Protestant Church in Bockenem was built in 1403, its baptismal font dates from 1703.
Another interesting church can be seen in the village of Nette. The romanesque tower has firing slits and may have been used as a fortification in times of war. The nave dates from 1731. Close to the church, several well-preserved half-timbered houses can be seen.

Local council (Stadtrat)

International relations

Bockenem is twinned with:
 Güntersberge, Germany
 Zawadzkie, Poland
 Thornbury, United Kingdom.
Meteor Gummiwerke is also located in Bockenem.  Meteor is an automotive sealing company that supplies seals worldwide.  Meteor is the largest factory in Bockenem employing over 1500 people.

Personalities 
 Karl-Heinz Bädje, (1917-1998), honorary citizen of the city in 1991 and founder of the company Meteor.
 Henriette Schrader-Breymann, (1827-1899), pioneer of the kindergarten system in Germany and early women's rights activist.
 Friedrich Buchholz, Mayor of the town of Bockenem from 1827 to 1865, also worked there as a lawyer. (1802-1865) The centrally located Buchholzmarkt was named after him
  Ernst Deger (1809-1885), significant church painter, especially in the Rhineland
 Johann Schwartzkopff, (1596-1658), lawyer at the University of Helmstedt and from 1646 Chancellor in the Duchy of Braunschweig
 Johann Friedrich Weule, (1811-1897), founder of the tower watch company J. F. Weule

References

External links
Description of Bockenem by Thornbury Town Council
Official site (In German)

Hildesheim (district)
Members of the Hanseatic League